Acmella is a genus of minute, land snails with an operculum, gastropod mollusks, or micromollusks, in the family Assimineidae.

Species
It consists of the following species:
Acmella nana Vermeulen, Liew & Schilthuizen, 2015 (the smallest terrestrial snail, described in 2015)
Acmella decolor
Acmella isseliana
Acmella minima
Acmella sutteri
Acmella taiwanica
Acmella cyrtoglyphe Vermeulen, Liew & Schilthuizen, 2015
Acmella umbilicata Vermeulen, Liew & Schilthuizen, 2015
Acmella polita Von Moellendorff, 1887
Acmella ovoidea Vermeulen, Liew & Schilthuizen, 2015
Acmella subcancellata Vermeulen, Liew & Schilthuizen, 2015
Acmella striata Vermeulen, Liew & Schilthuizen, 2015
Acmella tersa

References

External links
Global Species
ITIS
ZipcodeZoo

Assimineidae